Chengdu International School (CDIS) is an international school in Jinjiang District, Chengdu, Sichuan, China. 

Chengdu International School was established in 1997. CDIS offers an education in early childhood through 12th grade to expatriates living in Chengdu, Sichuan, China. English is the language of instruction. CDIS is part of the International Schools Consortium (iSC) – a non-profit organization with six schools around China and one in the UAE.

School & Community 

Chengdu International School is a college-preparatory international school, serving expatriate students from age 3 through grade 12. 

English is used as the main medium of instruction at the school, which operates under American educational standards. In addition to teachers from the United States, the faculty also includes members from China, Korea, India, South Africa, and Australia. Every teacher is required to hold a valid teaching license and bachelor's degree.

Curriculum 
CDIS offers an American, college-preparatory curriculum with Pre-AP, AP and AP Capstone programs for High school students. CDIS is one of just two international schools in the world to offer the exclusive Pre-AP Programming to 9th and 10th graders. Out of 72 High School students, 59 are currently enrolled in AP courses. In 2018, after just two years of operation, 12 students achieved certificates for AP Scholar with Distinction and 5 students received the AP Capstone Diploma.

School Contact 
Address: Chengdu International School (CDIS) 60 Shuinianhe Nanlu, Jinjiang District, Chengdu, China 610065 成都爱思瑟国际学校 中国四川省成都市锦江区 水碾河南路60号 610065

Website: www.cdischina.com

References

External links

 Chengdu International School

International schools in Chengdu
1997 establishments in China
Educational institutions established in 1997